Happy Go Lovely is a 1951 British musical comedy film in Technicolor, directed by H. Bruce Humberstone and starring Vera-Ellen, David Niven, and Cesar Romero. The film was made and first released in the UK, and distributed in the US by RKO Radio Pictures in 1952.

Plot
When chorus girl Janet Jones is late for rehearsal in Edinburgh, Bates, the chauffeur for B. G. Bruno, gives her a ride in Bruno's limousine, starting rumours that she is engaged to the wealthiest man in Scotland. American producer John Frost, her employer, has just had the star of his next show, Frolics to You, walk out on him because of his desperate financial situation. He replaces her with Janet, hoping that Bruno will back his revue, or at least that he can use Bruno's reputation to fend off impatient creditors. Her dressmaker, Madame Amanda, gives her more clothes, and sends the bill to Bruno. Janet's roommate, Mae Thompson, convinces her to continue the deception.

When Bruno receives the bill, he goes to the theatre to investigate. Janet mistakes him for reporter Paul Tracy, who was supposed to interview her. Finding Janet very attractive, Bruno does not correct her error. The two fall in love. Bruno amuses himself by continually asking Janet about her relationship with the millionaire.

Finally, Bruno gives Frost a cheque for £10,000. When Janet finds out, however, she confesses everything. On the opening night of Frolics to You, Bruno takes a box seat. Frost summons the police to have Bruno arrested as an impostor. In between performing on stage, Janet tries to make "Paul Tracy" hide or leave. During the hectic proceedings, Janet blurts out that she loves him. The police catch Bruno, but the inspector in charge recognizes him, much to the surprise of Janet and Frost, and all ends well.

Cast
 David Niven as B.G. Bruno
 Vera-Ellen as Janet Jones
 Cesar Romero as John Frost
 Bobby Howes as Charlie, Frost's assistant
 Diane Hart as Mae
 Gordon Jackson as Paul Tracy
 Barbara Couper as Madame Amanda
 Henry Hewitt as Dodds, Bruno's assistant
 Gladys Henson as Mrs. Urquhart, Janet and Mae's landlady
 Hugh Dempster as Bates
 Sandra Dorne as Betty
 Joyce Carey as Bruno's Secretary
 John Laurie as Jonskill, one of the creditors
 Wylie Watson as Stage Door Keeper
 Joan Heal as Phyllis Gardiner, the former star
 Hector Ross as Harold
 Ambrosine Phillpotts as Lady Martin
 Molly Urquhart as Madame Amanda's Assistant

Musical numbers
 "MacIntosh's Wedding" - Sung by Joan Heal, danced by Vera-Ellen and Chorus.
 "One-Two-Three" - Sung and danced by Vera-Ellen (dubbed by Eve Boswell) and Chorus.
 "London Town" - Danced by Vera-Ellen and Chorus.
 "Would You - Could You?"' - Sung and danced by Vera-Ellen (dubbed by Eve Boswell)

See also
 And Who Is Kissing Me? (1933)
 Paradise for Two (1937)
 List of films in the public domain in the United States

References

Further reading
 Craddock, Jim (2005). Videohound's Golden Movie Retriever. Farmington Hills, Michigan: Thomson Gale. .
 Martin, Mick, and Marsha Porter (2003). DVD & Video Guide 2004. New York: Ballantine Books. .
 Mundy, John (2007). The British musical film. Manchester: Manchester University Press. .
 Tuska, Jon (1991). Encounters with Filmmakers: Eight Career Studies. Westport, Connecticut: Greenwood Press. p. 33. .

External links
 
 
 
 
 

1951 films
1951 musical comedy films
1951 romantic comedy films
British musical comedy films
British remakes of German films
British romantic comedy films
Films shot at Associated British Studios
Films directed by H. Bruce Humberstone
Films set in Edinburgh
Films shot in Edinburgh
British romantic musical films
1950s English-language films
1950s British films